James Moores was an American politician from Maryland. He served as a member of the Maryland House of Delegates from 1829 to 1831 and 1833 to 1834 and as a member of the Maryland Senate from 1844 to 1849.

Career
Moores served as a member of the Maryland House of Delegates from 1829 to 1831 and 1833 to 1834. Moores served as a member of the Maryland Senate from 1844 to 1849. Moores was a Whig.

References

Year of birth unknown
Year of death missing
Members of the Maryland House of Delegates
Maryland state senators
Maryland Whigs
19th-century American politicians